Parascon is a genus of water bear or moss piglet, a tardigrade in the class Eutardigrada.

Species
 Parascon nichollsae Pilato and Lisi, 2004
 Parascon schusteri Pilato & Binda 1987

References

External links

Parachaela
Tardigrade genera
Polyextremophiles